Ladislav Křížek (born 24 April 1963) is a Czech singer, songwriter, and guitarist active since the mid-1980s.

Biography

Beginnings of a singing career
Křížek began his career in the now unknown group BMM, after which he joined the Žatec-based band Nervus Vegus. The real beginning of his career happened with the Prague band TAM. Křížek did not stay with them for long, however. In the first months of 1985, TAM was offered an opening slot for the annual concert of the band Orient, which they accepted without hesitation. Coincidentally, this concert was attended by members of the heavy metal band Vitacit, whose lead singer Dan Horyna departed in February of the same year. Vitacit liked Křížek's vocals so much that they immediately offered him the vacant spot, which he accepted.

Vitacit
Vitacit had been together since 1973, but had never recorded any material. In 1985, after Křížek joined, they met guitarist and singer Miloš "Dodo" Doležal, who became the band's new frontman. Křížek and Doležal went on to write a number of hit songs together.
Vitacit had much success and filled concert halls throughout 1985 and 1986. By 1987, they began to attract attention from record labels, and received several offers. In January of that year, however, Ladislav Křížek announced his departure from the band. His last concerts with Vitacit were held in a grim atmosphere, and on 15 March 1987, Křížek and Vitacit performed together for the last time.

Citron
In February 1987, the Ostrava-based metal band Citron was hit by an unexpected event. Their singer Stanislav Hranický broke his leg and was unable to perform for an extended period of time. For this reason, the band hired Ladislav Křížek as his replacement. They immediately began to work on their third album, titled Radegast. Upon release, the album went gold, and was the first big success for Křížek. The following year, Citron won the Zlatý slavík award. Citron went on to tour extensively, not only in Czechoslovakia, but also in Poland, the USSR, and Germany. They appeared frequently on television, topped music charts, and garnered much success during this period. In early 1989, the band began to prepare their next studio album, Vypusťte psy! (Release the Dogs!), but disagreements began to show among them. They managed to record a demo and release two singles, before Křížek departed the band in August 1989. Guitarist Jaroslav Bartoň followed, and together they formed the group Kreyson.

Kreyson and solo work

In 1989, Ladislav Křížek collaborated with Karel Svoboda on the title song for the well-known television series Dlouhá míle. In the same year, he founded his own band, Kreyson, together with Jaroslav Bartoň from Citron. In 1990, Kreyson released their first album, titled Anděl na útěku (Angel on the Run). The album was recorded in both Czech and English versions with the help of producer Jan Němec. The single "Vzdálená" (Far Away) proved to be a huge success, topping all domestic charts, and the band went on tour for the rest of the year. In 1990, Křížek released his first solo record, titled Zlatej chlapec (Golden Boy), which was also a big success and sold 100,000 copies within 14 days. Křížek won his second gold record. In the following years, Kreyson released the albums Křižáci (Crusaders), Elixír Života (Elixir of Life), and Zákon Džungle (Law of the Jungle). Just like Anděl na útěku, Křižáci came out both in Czech and in English. In 1993, Křížek released another solo album, titled Klíč k mé duši (The Key to My Soul), which received Diamond certification the following year for 400,000 copies sold. 1994 also saw the release of Best of Láďa Křížek, the artist's first compilation album. Towards the end of that year, Křížek sang a duet with internationally renowned Czech opera diva Eva Urbanová in a rock adaptation of The Phantom of the Opera. In 1995, Křížek was voted among the top three most popular singers in the nation. The same year, he sang the intro song to the cartoon O Malence together with Slovak singer Dara Rolins.
In 1996, the holiday album Kam hvězdy chodí spát (Where the Stars Go to Sleep) was released in collaboration with the Bambini di Praga youth choir. The album also included a duet with crooner Karel Gott on the song "Panis Angelicus".

Damiens and other projects
In 1997, Křížek recorded an album titled Všem Láskám with violin virtuoso Jaroslav Svěcený.
At the end of the year, he launched the group Damiens with his brother Miroslav Křížek. In the fall of 1998, the duo released the single "Lásko měj se" (Take Care, Love). In the same year, Křížek sang a duet with Kateřina Brožová on Michal David's musical Kráska a zvíře (Beauty and the Beast). In March 1999, Damiens released their debut album, entitled Křídla (Wings), which quickly won a gold record. In October of that year, they released Křídla - Zlatý bonus (Wings - Golden Bonus), which included bonus tracks to the original release. In the 1999 edition of Český slavík, the duo won the "Newcomer of the Year" award. On the occasion of Karel Gott's 60th birthday, Damiens performed his song "Adresát neznámý" (Addressee Unknown) at a large concert hall in Prague. Ladislav also sang Gott's famous hit "Paganini".
At the end of 2000, Damiens were invited by Karel Gott to host his concert tour České vánoce 2000 (Czech Christmas 2000). In the same year, the duo released their second album, Svět zázraků (World of Miracles), which again went gold for the sale of 25,000 copies.

In the spring of 2001, Křížek recorded the album Síla návratů (The Power of Returns) with Citron, a selection of hits he had sung with them in the past. In the same year, Damiens was again invited to play Karel Gott's Christmas tour. The following year, Damiens released another record, titled Nechci zůstat sám (I Don't Want to Be Alone), which went gold.

Země pohádek
Křížek's voice gained prominence in 2005, when he composed and sang the song "Země pohádek" (Land of Fairy Tales), as the theme of the advertising campaign for a children's online film store of the same name.

Return to Kreyson, Vitacit, and Citron
During 2006, Ladislav Křížek, together with guitarist Radek "Reddy" Kroc, performed all over the Czech Republic, playing acoustic arrangements of Vitacit, Citron, and Kreyson hits. In the middle of the year, Křížek resuscitated Kreyson, which had been on hiatus since 1996, and announced a contest to find new band members. A total of 90 experienced musicians took part, of which 37 were shortlisted. The final decision was made on 25 January 2007, and the band began to play again after 11 years of silence.

In May 2007, Křížek released the album Nejde vrátit čas? (Can't Turn Back Time?), a play on the popular 1990 Kreyson track "Nejde vrátit čas" (You Can't Turn Back Time). The album was composed of acoustic recordings of Křížek's older songs with Kreyson, Citron, and Vitacit, with Radek Kroc on guitar.
The same year, the live album Kreyson Live – Třinec 2007 was released. As a bonus, a duet with German singer Doro Pesch was added to the DVD edition. In July 2009, Kreyson released the compilation 20 Years of Kreyson. This album was created in cooperation with American independent label Retroactive Records. The same year, Křížek also began playing with Vitacit again, until 2015. During the summer of 2011, a new single was released by Kreyson, serving as a promo for the band's upcoming studio album Návrat krále (Return of the King), which came out in 2013.

In 2015, 26 years after leaving Citron, Křížek rejoined the band. He made significant contributions to their new album Rebelie rebelů (Rebellion of Rebels). As of April 2020, he continues to tour with the band.

Kreyson MMXVII
In May 2017, after another hiatus since the release of Návrat krále, Křížek announced a new lineup for Kreyson, this time with international contributions from German guitarist Roland Grapow (Helloween, Masterplan) and American drummer Mike Terrana (Rage, Masterplan). The band began to play shows and festivals, and a new album was discussed. As of April 2020, no new material has been released.

Discography

Vitacit
 Poslední Barča (1987 - live album)

Citron
 Radegast (1987)
 Radegast (1987 - English version)
 Vypusťte psy! (1989 - Demo)
 Síla návratů (2001)
 Rebelie Vol. 1 (2015 - EP)
 Rebelie Vol. 2 (2016 - EP)
 Rebelie rebelů (2016)

Kreyson
 Anděl na útěku (1990)
 Angel on the Run (1990)
 Křižáci (1992)
 Crusaders (1992)
 Elixír života (1993)
 Zákon džungle (1995)
 The Best of (1996 - compilation)
 Kreyson Live – Třinec 2007 (2007 - live CD/DVD)
 20 Years of Kreyson (2009 - compilation)
 Návrat krále (2013)

Damiens
 Křídla (1999)
 Křídla - Zlatý bonus (1999)
 Svět zázraků (2000)
 Nashledanou 2000 (2000 - EP)
 Svět zázraků - Nashledanou (2000 - compilation)
 Nechci zůstat sám (2002)
 Největší hity (2003 - compilation)

Solo
 Zlatej chlapec (1991)
 Klíč k mé duši (1993)
 Best of Láďa Křížek (1994)
 Kam hvězdy chodí spát (1995)
 Zlaté Hity (1999 - compilation)
 Nejde vrátit čas? (2007)

Other projects
 Všem Láskám (1997 - with Jaroslav Svěcený)

References

External links
 Ladislav Křížek official website

1963 births
Living people
Czechoslovak male singers
Czech guitarists
Male guitarists
20th-century Czech male singers
Czech male composers